Batakiai (Samogitian: Batakē) is a town in Taurage County, Lithuania. According to the 2011 census, the town has a population of 246 people.

Gallery

References

Towns in Lithuania
Towns in Tauragė County
Rossiyensky Uyezd